Hematopoietic cell signal transducer is a protein that in humans is encoded by the HCST gene.

This gene encodes a transmembrane signaling adaptor that contains a YxxM motif in its cytoplasmic domain. The encoded protein may form part of the immune recognition receptor complex with the C-type lectin-like receptor NKG2D. As part of this receptor complex, this protein may activate phosphatidylinositol 3-kinase dependent signaling pathways through its intracytoplasmic YxxM motif. This receptor complex may have a role in cell survival and proliferation by activation of NK and T cell responses. Alternative splicing results in two transcript variants encoding different isoforms.

References

Further reading